San Basso is a Baroque style deconsecrated Roman Catholic church in central Venice, Italy; it now serves as a concert hall.

According to the Venetian historian Flaminio Corner, the church was erected in the year 1079. It was rebuilt after fires in 1105 and again in 1661, the latter to a design by Baldassarre Longhena. Located nearby the St. Mark's Clocktower, it has a side façade on the Piazza San Marco. It has four Corinthian columns and two single mullioned windows.

In 1806, during the Napoleonic occupation, the church was closed and sold to a private source. In 1847 it was ceded to the Basilica di San Marco, which used it to store marbles and sculptures until, in the 1890s, it was restored as a meeting and concert hall.

Roman Catholic churches completed in 1661
17th-century Roman Catholic church buildings in Italy
Basso
Basso
Basso
Basso
1661 establishments in Italy